Byagliaty is a village in the Nakhchivan Autonomous Republic of Azerbaijan.

It is suspected that this village has undergone a name change or no longer exists, as no Azerbaijani website mentions it under this name.

See also
Abandoned towns

References
 

Populated places in Azerbaijan
Populated places in Nakhchivan Autonomous Republic